Johnathan Pereira da Silva (born 8 January 1992), simply known as Johnathan, is a Brazilian footballer who plays as a forward.

Club career
Born in Guarulhos, São Paulo, Johnathan graduated with Corinthians' youth setup. In 2013, he made his senior debuts, while on loan at hometown's Flamengo.

After struggling severely with injuries, Johnathan decided to retire from football. In 2015, however, he was convinced to return playing, and joined Independente de Limeira.

On 8 May 2015, Johnathan signed for Bragantino. He made his professional debut on 4 July, coming on as a second-half substitute and scoring his team's only in a 1–2 home loss against Santa Cruz for the Série B championship.

On 15 September 2015 Johnathan moved to Portuguesa, after being rarely used by Braga.

References

External links

1992 births
Living people
People from Guarulhos
Brazilian footballers
Association football forwards
Campeonato Brasileiro Série B players
Sport Club Corinthians Paulista players
Clube Atlético Bragantino players
Associação Portuguesa de Desportos players
Associação Atlética Internacional (Limeira) players
Footballers from São Paulo (state)